Bigg Boss Ultimate (or BB Ultimate for short) is a spin-off Indian Tamil-language reality Streaming television show that airs exclusively on Disney+ Hotstar. Hosted by Silambarasan.

The first season of the show premiered on 30 January 2022 with Kamal Haasan as host. However the host has exited the show from week 3 onwards, due to scheduling conflicts with his upcoming film Vikram, Silambarasan continued as a host from week 4 onwards.

Concept 
As with the televised series, the group of contestants—referred to as Housemates—are enclosed in the Bigg Boss House under constant surveillance of cameras and microphones. However, the contestants that participate in this edition are all the popular contestants who participated in the original edition Bigg Boss in various different seasons and brand new celebrity contestants as well. The winner of Bigg Boss Ultimate will receive ₹35 lakh and the "Ultimate edition" trophy.

What separated this from the main televised series was that the show is a 24/7 non-stop show unlike the 1 hour time for the original edition.

Development
The spin-off  edition was officially announced on 16 January 2022, by Star Vijay while the grand finale of the fifth season was still in progress. However after the conclusion of the fifth season from the main edition, The makers announced that the Bigg Boss house will be the same from the fifth season however minor changes will be done to the designs of the house. The makers also announced that unlike the original series where each season lasts for 105 days and 15 weeks, the Ultimate edition will only contain 56 days and 8 weeks each season but Season 1 was extended to 70 Days.

Broadcasts
There was no television coverage for this edition; instead, it would be completely streamed online at Disney+ Hotstar for 24×7 coverage. However a daily 1.30 hour main coverage episodes telecast on Disney+ Hotstar everyday at 9:00 pm.

House
The location for the house is still set to remain at Chennai like how it did for the original series. However minor changes and renovation is done to the house for this edition.
The house contains a living area, One large bedroom, kitchen, garden, bathroom, store room, smoking room and an underground jail (for punishment purposes only). The house also contains a confession room where contestants speak private matters to Bigg Boss.

Series overview 

 Female Winners
 Male Winners

Housemates Pattern

Controversies

Bigg Boss Ultimate 1
Vanitha Vijayakumar argued with all the co housemates and Bigg Boss demanding that she won't participate in the luxury budget task until she receives coffee. She later went on to hide every housemates tea and milk since she isn't given her coffee.
During the pressmeet luxury budget task, Niroop Nandhakumar confessed to every housemate saying that he was in a relationship with his co housemate Abhirami Venkatachalam before joining the game.
During the live streaming, the camera focused on Abhirami Venkatachalam who was caught smoking in the smoking room. However the video wasn't censored and was telecasted, however audience were shocked by the act and accusing the company of promoting smoking.
Niroop used cuss words against fellow contestant Maria Juliana, and the host failed to punish him made severe condemn by audience
Finale results of Maria Juliana and Thamarai ending up in 4th, 5th spots were rigged and questioned the genunity of Audience votes as audience expected them to be in top 3
Niroop and Ramya was accused for giving tons of money to Pradeep Mil Roy and earned their spot in top 3

References

External links 
 Official Website at Hotstar

Tamil-language Disney+ Hotstar original programming
Tamil-language reality television series
Tamil-language game shows
Tamil-language television shows
Ultimate
Kamal Haasan
Indian television series based on non-Indian television series
2022 Tamil-language television series debuts
Tamil-language television spin-offs